Larry Jost (February 22, 1921 – October 28, 2001) was an American sound engineer. He was nominated for three Academy Awards in the category Best Sound. He worked on over 45 films between 1961 and 1984.

Selected filmography
 The Day of the Dolphin (1973)
 The Paper Chase (1973)
 Chinatown (1974)

References

External links

1921 births
2001 deaths
People from Detroit
American audio engineers
20th-century American engineers